NGC 1400 is an elliptical galaxy in the constellation Eridanus. At a distance of 65 million light-years from Earth, it was discovered by John Herschel in 1786. It is a member of the NGC 1407 group, whose brightest member is NGC 1407. The NGC 1407 group is part of the Eridanus Cluster, a cluster of 200 galaxies.

NGC 1400 is an early-type E0 galaxy. Despite their name, early-type galaxies are much older than spiral galaxies, and mostly comprise old, red-colored stars. Very little star formation occurs in these galaxies; the lack of star formation in elliptical galaxies appears to start at the center and then slowly propagates outward. 

NGC 1400 has had star formation in the past, which was caused by NGC 1400 falling into the NGC 1407 group.

Gallery

References

External links 
 

Elliptical galaxies
Eridanus (constellation)
1400
013470